Sedeh District may refer to:
 Sedeh District (Fars Province)
 Sedeh District (South Khorasan Province)

See also
 Sedeh Rural District (disambiguation)